Greystoke is a civil parish in the Eden District, Cumbria, England. It contains 49 listed buildings that are recorded in the National Heritage List for England. Of these, one is listed at Grade I, the highest of the three grades, five are at Grade II*, the middle grade, and the others are at Grade II, the lowest grade.  The parish contains the villages of Greystoke, Little Blencow, Johnby, and Motherby, and the surrounding countryside.  Three of the listed buildings originated as fortified tower houses that were later converted into country houses.  Most of the listed buildings are houses and associated structures, farmhouses and farm buildings.  The other listed buildings include a church and items in the churchyard, a village cross, a public house, a school, a chapel, and a bridge.


Key

Buildings

Notes and references

Notes

Citations

Sources

Lists of listed buildings in Cumbria